Trichocyte in algae are cells which grow on the outside of the thallus, from which hairs grow.
In algae, trichocytes grow principally over the summer; their growth is mediated by water temperature and day length.

References

Algal anatomy